Brigitte Deydier (born 12 November 1958) is a retired French judoka who is an officer of the Legion of Honour. She chaired the France Sport Association from 2001 to 2004 and is general director of the 2018 Ryder Cup.

She also won a silver medal in the -61 kg division at the 1988 Summer Olympics in Seoul, where women's judo was held as a demonstration sport.

References

External links
 

World judo champions
Officiers of the Légion d'honneur
1958 births
Living people
Judoka at the 1988 Summer Olympics
French female judoka
Commanders of the Ordre national du Mérite
Olympic judoka of France
20th-century French women
21st-century French women